Seychelles–Turkey relations are the foreign relations between Seychelles and Turkey.
The Turkish ambassador in Nairobi, Kenya is accredited to Seychelles. Seychelles is accredited to Turkey from its embassy in Paris, France. The Seychelles also maintains honorary consulates in Ankara and Istanbul.

Diplomatic relations 
Seychelles and Turkey support each other in promoting the concept of the Indian Ocean as a zone of peace, campaigning for the removal of all foreign powers and bases in the region. Turkey, however, has been silent about the United States naval presence on Diego Garcia.

Seychelles and Turkey cooperated in condemning apartheid policies in South Africa and modifying their previously hostile political stance when South Africa converted to a multiracial political system.

Economic relations 
 Trade volume between the two countries was 25.4 million USD in 2018 (Turkish exports/imports: 17.7/7.7 million USD).

Educational relations 
Seychelles has succeeded in attracting relatively large amounts of aid, with France as the leading donor. Turkey also extended a modest amount of aid, primarily in the form of education and development programs, as part of its efforts to become engaged in the Indian Ocean region.

See also 

 Foreign relations of Seychelles
 Foreign relations of Turkey

References

Further reading 
 Anand, J.P. "The Seychelles Group: A Profile," IDSA (Institute for Defence Studies and Analyses) Journal [New Delhi], 11, January-March 1999, pp. 287-302. 
 Filliot, Jean-Michel. Les Seychelles et la revolution française. Paris: ORSTOM, Institut français de recherche scientifique pour le développement en cooperation: Ministère de la cooperation et du développement, 1999. 
 Franda, Marcus F. Quiet Turbulence in the Seychelles: Tourism and Development. (American Field Staff Reports, Asia Series, No. 10.) Hanover, New Hampshire, 1999.
 Franda, Marcus F. The Seychelles: Unquiet Islands. Boulder, Colorado: Westview Press, 1992.Hoare, Mike. The Seychelles Affair. New York: Bantam Press, 1996. 
 International Monetary Fund. Seychelles: Recent Economic Developments. Washington: 1993. 
 Lee. C. Seychelles: Political Castaways. London: Hamish Hamilton, 1996.
 Mukonoweshuro, Eliphas G. "'Radicalism' and the Struggle for Affluence in the Seychelles," Scandinavian Journal of Development Alternatives [Stockholm], 10, March-June 1999, pp. 139-71. 
 Rowe, JW .F. Report on the Economy of the Seychelles and Its Future Development. Mahe: Government Printer, 1999. 
 Seychelles. Central Statistical Office. Seychelles Handbook. Mahe: 1976. 
 Vine, Peter. Seychelles. (2d ed.) London: Immel, 2002. 

Turkey
Bilateral relations of Turkey